In mathematics the Montgomery curve is a form of elliptic curve introduced by Peter L. Montgomery in 1987, different from the usual Weierstrass form. It is used for certain computations, and in particular in different cryptography applications.

Definition

A Montgomery curve over a field  is defined by the equation

Montgomery arithmetic
It is possible to do some "operations" between the points of an elliptic curve:  "adding" two points  consists of finding a third one  such that ; "doubling" a point consists of computing  (For more information about operations see The group law) and below.

Notice that this kind of representation for a point loses information: indeed, in this case, there is no distinction between the affine points  and  because they are both given by the point . However, with this representation it is possible to obtain multiples of points, that is, given , to compute .

Now, considering the two points  and : their sum is given by the point  whose coordinates are:

 

 

 

 

 

The first operation considered above (addition) has a time-cost of 3M+2S, where M denotes the multiplication between two general elements of the field on which the elliptic curve is defined, while S denotes squaring of a general element of the field.

Algorithm and example
The following algorithm represents a doubling of a point  on an elliptic curve in the Montgomery form.

It is assumed that . The cost of this implementation is 1M + 2S + 1*A + 3add + 1*4. Here M denotes the multiplications required, S indicates the squarings, and a refers to the multiplication by A.

Example
Let  be a point on the curve .

Then:

 

 

 

The result is the point  such that .

Addition

 

In particular this equation can be re-written as:

 

3) Comparing the coefficients of the two identical equations given above, in particular the coefficients of the terms of second degree, one gets:

 .

 

4) To find the  coordinate of the point  it is sufficient to substitute the value  in the line . Notice that this will not give the point  directly. In other words, it will be necessary to change the sign of the  coordinate obtained by substituting the value  in the equation of the line.

Resuming, the coordinates of the point ,  are:

Doubling

 

then the value of l, which represents the slope of the line, is given by:

 

by the implicit function theorem.

So  and the coordinates of the point ,  are:

Equivalence with twisted Edwards curves
Let  be a field with characteristic different from 2.

Let  be an elliptic curve in the Montgomery form:

 

and let  be an elliptic curve in the twisted Edwards form:

 

with 

The following theorem shows the birational equivalence between Montgomery curves and twisted Edwards curve:

The map:

 

 

 : 

 

Equivalence with Weierstrass curves
Any elliptic curve can be written in Weierstrass form. In particular, the elliptic curve in the Montgomery form

 :  

can be transformed in the following way:

 

To obtain a short Weierstrass form from here, it is sufficient to replace u with the variable :

 

finally, this gives the equation:

 

Hence the mapping is given as

 : 

 

In contrast, an elliptic curve over base field  in Weierstrass form

 : 

can be converted to Montgomery form if and only if  has order divisible by four and satisfies the following conditions:

  has at least one root ; and

When these conditions are satisfied, then for  we have the mapping

 : 

 .

See also
 Curve25519
 Table of costs of operations in elliptic curves – information about the running-time required in a specific case

Notes

References

External links
Genus-1 curves over large-characteristic fields

Elliptic curves
Elliptic curve cryptography